ELO's Greatest Hits Vol. 2 is an album by the Electric Light Orchestra (ELO), released in 1992 as a follow up to their more successful ELO's Greatest Hits, though it was not issued in the U.S.

Track listing

Personnel
 Jeff Lynne - lead vocals & backing vocals, acoustic guitar, electric guitar and slide guitars, percussion, synthesizer, piano
 Bev Bevan - drums, percussion, backing vocals
 Richard Tandy - piano, synthesizer, keyboards, electric guitar, clavinet, grand piano, Mellotron, percussion, backing vocals
 Kelly Groucutt - vocals, bass guitar, percussion, backing vocals (except on "Calling America")

Additional
 Mik Kaminski - violin on "Rock n' Roll Is King" 
 Melvyn Gale - jangle piano on "Wild West Hero"
 Louis Clark - string arrangements, conductor on "Discovery" & "Xanadu" tracks
 Rainer Pietsch - conductor on "Time" tracks
 Dave Morgan - additional backing vocals on "Rock n' Roll Is King"

References

1992 greatest hits albums
Albums produced by Jeff Lynne
Electric Light Orchestra compilation albums
Epic Records compilation albums